Absolute Value is the second studio album by Boston rapper Akrobatik. It was released on February 19, 2008 by Fat Beats Records. The album features guest appearances by hip hop artists Talib Kweli, Chuck D, and B-Real, as well as production by 9th Wonder, Illmind, J Dilla, and Da Beatminerz. Despite receiving rave reviews, the album sold about 600 units in its opening week.

Critical reception

Marisa Brown of AllMusic gave the album 4 stars out of 5, commenting that it "mixes his socially conscious messages and his battle-honed cadence, healthy ego, and energetic production (courtesy here of Illmind, Dilla, J-Zone, and 9th Wonder, among others) into a palatable but intelligent creation that entertains as much as it educates." She added,  "Absolute Value has a few requisite tracks -- the melancholy 'Rain,' the sweet 'Back Home to You' -- but it also has a lot of sharp, thoughtful, fun material that knows how to keep the audience moving, both in body and mind." J-23 of HipHopDX gave the album a 4.0 out of 5, saying, "you won't find anything on this album that will have you reaching for the skip button."

Andrew Martin of PopMatters gave the album 7 stars out of 10, calling it "a strong representation of Ak's versatility as an emcee." Max Herman of XLR8R gave the album a 7.5 out of 10, writing, "the MC leaves the greatest impression when he balances his hard-hitting approach with focused subject matter as he does on the Little Brother-assisted 'Be Prepared,' a soulful examination of the rap game."

Track listing

Personnel
Credits adapted from liner notes.

 Akrobatik – vocals
 B-Real – vocals (1)
 Illmind – production (1, 5, 9, 12)
 Da Beatminerz – production (2)
 DJ Evil Dee – turntables (2)
 Talib Kweli – vocals (3)
 J Dilla – production (3)
 DJ Jayceeoh – turntables (3, 4, 6, 10, 14)
 Hezekiah – production (4)
 Brenna Gethers – vocals (5, 9)
 Little Brother – vocals (6)
 9th Wonder – production (6)
 J-Zone – production (7)
 Willie Evans Jr. – vocals (8)
 DJ Therapy – vocals (8), production (8, 14), turntables (13)
 Chuck D – vocals (9)
 Tzarizm – production (10)
 Mr. Lif – vocals (11)
 DJ Fakts One – production (11)
 Bumpy Knuckles – vocals (12)
 Baba Israel – production (13)
 Yako – production (13)
 Buttaskotch – engineering
 Lucy Fernandes – engineering
 Ray Fernandes – engineering
 Sir Bob Nash – engineering
 Mark Donahue – mastering
 Alphabet Arm Design – art direction
 Billy Nunez – illustration
 A. Garcia – photography

References

External links
 

2008 albums
Akrobatik albums
Fat Beats Records albums
Albums produced by 9th Wonder
Albums produced by Da Beatminerz
Albums produced by Illmind
Albums produced by J Dilla
Albums produced by J-Zone